One aspect of the differences between American and British English is that of specific word pronunciations, as described in American and British English pronunciation differences. However, there are also differences in some of the basic pronunciation patterns between the standard dialects of each country. The standard varieties for each are in fact generalizations: for the U.S., a loosely defined spectrum of unmarked varieties called General American (abbreviated "GA") and, for Britain, a collection of prestigious varieties most common in southeastern England, ranging from upper- to middle-class Received Pronunciation accents (often classified along a continuum with local Estuary English), which together here are abbreviated "RP". However, other regional accents in each country also show differences, for which see regional accents of English speakers.

Received Pronunciation has been the subject of many academic studies, and is frequently used as a model for teaching English to foreign learners. The widely repeated claim that only about two percent of Britons speak RP is no more than a rough estimate and has been questioned by several writers, most notably by the phonetician J. Windsor Lewis.

Phonological differences
 Rhoticity – GA is rhotic while RP is non-rhotic; that is, the phoneme  is only pronounced in RP when it is immediately followed by a vowel sound. This leads to several RP mergers characteristic of non-rhotic accents, whereas GA maintains these distinctions. The "intrusive R" of many RP speakers (in such sequences as "the idea-r-of it") is absent in GA; this is a consequence of the rhotic/non-rhotic distinction.
 The trap–bath split has resulted in RP having the back unrounded open vowel  in many words where GA has a front open unrounded vowel ; this RP vowel occurs typically (but not always) when followed by:
Several foreign names and loanwords spelled with  use  in RP but  in GA, such as kebab, pasta, macho, and taco. In a small number of words, these phonemes are exactly reversed in the two dialects, such as banana, khaki, and Pakistan.
 RP has three open back vowels, where GA has only two or even one.
 Nearly half of American speakers additionally use the same vowel for the RP  (the cot–caught merger).
 While the lot–cloth split is not usually found in RP, it is found in those GA speakers who do not have the cot–caught merger (which otherwise neutralizes this split). This is reflected in the "eye dialect" spelling "dawg" for dog.
 "Long o" and "short o" before intervocalic /r/ have merged in American English.
In GA this contrast is somewhat less evident and non-phonemic, so the IPA length symbol is often omitted.
 The "long o" (as in boat) is realised differently: GA back first element ; RP central first element . However, there is considerable variation in this vowel on both sides of the Atlantic.
Thus in RP, edition  and addition  are not homophones.
 Where GA has  in an unstressed syllable at the end of a morpheme, conservative RP has , not having undergone happy-tensing. For many RP speakers, the vowel does tense word-finally, but this distinction is still retained in inflected forms (e.g. candied and candid are homophones in RP, but not in GA).
The degree of flapping varies considerably among speakers, and is often reduced in more formal settings. It does occur to an extent in nearly all speakers of American English, with better pronounced with a flap almost ubiquitously regardless of background. Pronouncing the t would be considered overly formal.
 Yod-dropping occurs in GA at the onset of stressed syllables after all alveolar consonants, including ; i.e. historic  (from spellings u, ue, eu, ew), is pronounced . In contrast, RP speakers:
 always retain  after : e.g. new is RP , GA ;
 retain or drop it after : e.g. allude is RP  or (as GA) ;
 retain, coalesce in stressed or unstressed syllables, or drop it after : e.g. assume is RP , or (as GA) .
Yod-coalescence occur in both GA and RP in unstressed syllables or after a stressed vowel. RP however more often retains the yod, especially in carefully enunciated forms of words. This is also found in other English accents.
However, this pronunciation is considered incorrect, but it had already been widespread in American television as early as 1990 and was described in that year's Orlando Sentinel article as a "corruption of the language" so that it has been either unconventional or nonexistent in RP.
 For some RP speakers (upper class), unlike in GA, some or all of tyre (tire), tower, and tar are homophones; this reflects the merger of the relevant vowels.
 The voiceless stops /t/, /p/, and /k/ have a stronger aspiration in RP.
 Most General American accents, but not British ones, have undergone vowel mergers before /r/: the nearer–mirror and hurry–furry mergers, and some variation of the Mary–marry–merry merger, a total three-way merger being the most common throughout North America.
 GA accents usually have some degree of merging weak vowels.
 Disyllabic laxing is more common in American than in British English, with a short vowel in GA and a long vowel in RP in such words as era, patent and lever.
 Trisyllabic laxing however is somewhat less common in GA than in RP, for example in privacy, vitamin and spherical.

See also
Phonological history of the English language: After the American–British split, up to the 20th century (c. AD 1725–1900) and After 1900.
American and British English pronunciation differences
General American
Received Pronunciation

References

Bibliography

American and British English differences
English phonology